Norman Braman (born August 23, 1932) is an American billionaire car dealer, art collector, and former owner of the Philadelphia Eagles.

Early life and education
Braman was born in 1932 in West Chester, Pennsylvania, and grew up in the Cobbs Creek section of Philadelphia, where his father owned a barbershop. Braman's parents were Jewish emigrants from Europe. His Romanian-born mother was a seamstress and his Polish father a barber. Braman was a water boy in his teenage years at the Eagles training camp, which was then in Hershey, Pennsylvania. During the season, he would sneak into Shibe Park to watch the team play. Braman attended West Philadelphia High School and graduated from Temple University in 1955 with a degree in business administration.

Career
Braman began his career as a market research analyst for Seagram's Distributors in 1955.  A few years later he took an executive position at Bargaintown U.S.A., a company owned by his father-in-law, in Lebanon, Pennsylvania.  The business eventually became Keystone Discount Stores, a chain of self-service variety stores in the Philadelphia area.  In the mid-1960s he spearheaded a merger between Keystone and Philadelphia Laboratories to create Philadelphia Pharmaceuticals and Cosmetics.  Braman was appointed president and CEO of the new company.  Acquisitions under his tenure at PP&C included Vitamix Pharmaceuticals, F.A. Martin and Company, and U.S. Cocoa Corporation.  Braman stepped down from his position at Philadelphia Pharmaceuticals and Cosmetics in 1969 to pursue other interests.

Braman got his start in the automobile business in 1972 when he acquired controlling interest of Sharpe-Taylor Cadillac in Tampa, Florida.  During these early years, Braman was mentored by well known car dealer and fellow Philadelphia native Victor Potamkin.  In 1975, Braman bought the former Nolan Brown Cadillac in Miami, Florida.  The following year, Braman took on his first import brands with the purchase of BMW and Rolls-Royce dealership C.R. Berry Motors and moved both franchises next to his Miami Cadillac dealership.  By 1980, Braman had Cadillac, BMW, Rolls-Royce, Fiat, Lancia, and Toyota dealerships along the 2000 block of Biscayne Boulevard in Miami.

While continuing to expand his dealership holdings in the South Florida area, Braman also added dealerships in Colorado.  Today, Braman serves as chairman of Braman Management, an umbrella company for his automotive businesses that include dealerships in Florida and Colorado selling Acura, Audi, Bentley, BMW, Bugatti, Cadillac, Genesis, Honda, Hyundai, Kia, Mercedes-Benz, MINI, Porsche and Rolls-Royce.

In addition to his retail automotive businesses, Braman had majority ownership of Austin Rover Cars of North America (ARCONA), the distributorship for Sterling automobiles imported to the United States starting in 1987.  The company's name was changed to Sterling Motor Cars in 1989 and closed in 1991 after sales of the Rover 800-based Sterling 825/827 models failed to meet expectations.

According to Forbes in July 2022, Braman has a net worth of US$2.6 billion.

Philadelphia Eagles
Braman and his brother-in-law, Ed Leibowitz, became owners of the Philadelphia Eagles in April 1985 having acquired them from Leonard Tose for a reported $65 million.  Initially, Braman owned 65% of the team while Leibowitz owned 35%.  In July 1986, Braman bought out Leibowitz’s interest.  During Braman's ownership, the Eagles made playoff appearances in 1988, 1989, 1990 and 1992.  They were NFC East division champions in 1988.

In 1994, Braman agreed to sell the team to a group led by movie producer Jeffrey Lurie.  The reported selling price was $185 million, a record for a sports team franchise at that time.

Politics

Ronald Reagan nominated Braman to lead Immigration and Naturalization Services in September 1981. In November 1981, before Senatorial hearings began, Braman withdraw his nomination, citing the need to focus on his businesses.

He financially supported a recall election against Miami-Dade Mayor Carlos Alvarez because of a huge property tax increase and pay hikes to Alvarez's top staffers. On March 15, 2011, close to 90% of those that turned out to vote that day in Miami-Dade County, voted to recall the mayor. It is believed to be one of the most lopsided recall elections in the history of American elections.

In 2012, Braman established political groups to campaign against four incumbent Miami-Dade County commissioners with $440,000 in funding, focusing on the commissioners' support for the controversial Marlins Park project and a property tax hike in 2010.

Braman was a supporter of Marco Rubio, and was considering spending anywhere between 10 million to 25 million in support of his 2016 presidential campaign. According to the acknowledgements in his autobiography, Rubio has thanked Braman for being a supporter, and Braman has employed at one time or another Marco Rubio's wife, Jeanette Dousdebes Rubio, at the Braman family's charitable foundation.

Philanthropy
Braman and his wife, Irma, established the Norman and Irma Braman Family Foundation, which primarily helps fund medical and educational projects throughout the world.  It is headed by their daughter Debra Wechsler.

Braman, an art collector, also serves as president of the Irma and Norman Braman Art Foundation, which supports the arts and culture in and around the Miami area.

Personal life
Braman is married to Irma Miller. They have two daughters: Debra Wechsler and Suzi Lustgarten.

References

External links
 Norman Braman: Eagles Owner Los Angeles Times

1932 births
Living people
American billionaires
Jewish American sportspeople
American automobile salespeople
Philadelphia Eagles owners
Fox School of Business and Management alumni
People from West Chester, Pennsylvania
American people of Polish-Jewish descent
American people of Romanian-Jewish descent
Florida Republicans
21st-century American Jews